Fantofarone is a calcium channel blocker.

Fantofarone vs Verapamil 
There are many different calcium channel blockers that show different results in use. Fantofarone and Verapamil are both calcium channel blockers that behave differently in different applications.

Fantofarone was shown in use for treatment of angioplasty-induced vasospasm in an atherosclerotic rabbits. There are many different observations that show a potential cause of vasospasm, such as local injury on the body,  but overall mechanism of it is still not fully understood. In order to observe the efficiency of Fantofarone in the treatment of AIV (Angioplasty-Induced Vasospasm), it was compared to the treatment of verapamil (which is also a calcium channel blocker). Fantofarone showed more effectiveness against a severity of vasospasm than verapamil. 

Fantofarone and Verapamil was also tested as an attempt of reversing of chloroquine resistance(Chloroquine is a medication that is used to treat malaria). In the treatment of reversing the chloroquine resistance it was observed that verapamil was more potent and more efficient than Fantofarone.

References

Calcium channel blockers
Indolizines
Phenol ethers
Isopropyl compounds